Wasted Youth is a Greek drama film from 2011, directed by Argyris Papadimitropoulos.

The film was inspired by the shooting of Alexandros Grigoropoulos, one of the events that led to the 2008 Greek riots.

Plot 
Harris, a teenage skater, hangs out with his friends experiencing Athens and girls. A middle aged cop, Vassilis, seems unhappy with his life. One night the two cross paths.

References 

Greek drama films
2011 films
2010s Greek-language films
Films shot in Athens